Promedon (Ancient Greek: Προμέδων) is a name referring to the following characters in Greek myth or legend:

Promedon, an otherwise unknown figure mentioned in Pausanias' description of Polygnotus' paintings at Lesche in Delphi. Promedon is said to have been depicted leaning against a willow in what seems to be a sacred grove of Persephone, next to such figures as Patroclus and Orpheus. The ancient sources Pausanias claims to have consulted had no uniform opinion concerning Promedon: from some it appeared he was a mere creation of Polygnotus, while others reportedly mentioned him as a music lover who especially favored the singing of Orpheus; thus he could have been believed to be a follower of Orpheus.
Promedon of Naxos, a man seduced by his best friend's wife Neaera.

Notes

References 

 Parthenius, Love Romances translated by Sir Stephen Gaselee (1882-1943), S. Loeb Classical Library Volume 69. Cambridge, MA. Harvard University Press. 1916.  Online version at the Topos Text Project.
 Parthenius, Erotici Scriptores Graeci, Vol. 1. Rudolf Hercher. in aedibus B. G. Teubneri. Leipzig. 1858. Greek text available at the Perseus Digital Library.
 Pausanias, Description of Greece with an English Translation by W.H.S. Jones, Litt.D., and H.A. Ormerod, M.A., in 4 Volumes. Cambridge, MA, Harvard University Press; London, William Heinemann Ltd. 1918. . Online version at the Perseus Digital Library
 Pausanias, Graeciae Descriptio. 3 vols. Leipzig, Teubner. 1903.  Greek text available at the Perseus Digital Library.

Characters in Greek mythology